Matutidae is a family of crabs, sometimes called moon crabs, adapted for swimming or digging. They differ from the swimming crabs of the family Portunidae in that all five pairs of legs are flattened, rather than just the last pair, as in Portunidae. Crabs in the Matutidae are aggressive predators.

Taxonomy
Traditionally, this taxon contained the single genus Matuta, and was considered a subfamily of the Calappidae. Now, the group is ranked as a family and six genera (four extant and two fossil) are now recognised. Although placed in the Calappoidea, it is not clear that Matutidae and Calappidae are closely related.
Ashtoret Galil & P. F. Clark, 1994
† Eomatuta De Angeli & Marchiori, 2009
Izanami Galil & P. F. Clark, 1994
Matuta Weber, 1795
Mebeli Galil & P. F. Clark, 1994
† Szaboa Müller & Galil, 1998

Fossil record
Szaboa is known only from Hungarian fossil deposits of Middle Miocene age. Eomatuta was described from the Middle Eocene of Italy in 2009. Fossils of Ashtoret have also been found in Miocene deposits in Japan.

References

Calappoidea
Taxa named by Wilhem de Haan